This is a list of rail accidents from 1980 to 1989.

1980 
Nineteen people are seriously injured.
 April 2 – United States – Lakeview, North Carolina: Amtrak's Silver Star collided head-on with a Seaboard Coast Line freight train, injuring 123. It was determined that the engineer of the Amtrak train failed to reduce speed and comply with approach signal indications, causing the collision. Dense fog conditions also factored into the accident.
 April 9 – United States – Western Pacific Railroad Company westbound freight train Extra UP 3734 West (Sealand 6), had its caboose, a pusher locomotive behind the caboose, and seven freight cars derail while crossing the Industrial Parkway overpass at Hayward, California. Of the nine crewmembers, two train crewmembers were killed and two were injured. Three locomotive units and the caboose were destroyed.
 May 22 – United Kingdom – A sleeper train is derailed at Prestonpans, Lothian due to a vandal placing a length of rail across the line.
 July 9 – United States – Amtrak passenger train 225 was struck by a 15-foot (4.6-metre) section of rail protruding from the side of a railcar at Linden, New Jersey. The rail penetrated the first car of passenger train, struck and killed one passenger, and injured 17 others.
 July 17 – United States – North Wales, Pennsylvania: SEPTA commuter train 472 being operated from the second car of the train collides with train number 406 stopped at North Wales station, 67 were injured, none fatally.
 July 25 – Netherlands – Winsum train collision: Two trains collide on a single track between Groningen and Roodeschool resulting in 9 deaths and 21 injured.
 August 1 – Ireland – Buttevant Rail Disaster, County Cork: A train on the main Dublin – Cork line is routed by mistake into a siding and derails, leaving 18 dead and 62 injured.
 August 19 – Poland – Otłoczyn railway accident: A freight train runs through a red light and slams into a passenger train traveling from Toruń to Łódź. The accident near Otłoczyn killed 67 people and injured 65.
 October 4 – USSR –: Two passenger trains collided at Tallinn main station (now in Estonia) after a departing train had passed red signal. 9 people were killed, 46 were injured.
 November 17 – United States – Cima Hill, California: Runaway Union Pacific Railroad train loaded with ties is unable to brake and crashes into another train near Kelso, California. Three of eight total railroad workers killed; one is critically injured but survives.
 November 21 – Italy – Curinga train disaster: A Rome-Siracusa express train rammed into 69 cars of a freight train, and then derailed the Sicily-Rome express train, crushing four passenger cars at Curinga near Lamezia Terme, Catanzaro, killing 29 people and injuring 104.
 December 13 – Yugoslavia – A freight train fails to wait for an oncoming passenger train and collides with it head-on near Bosanska Krupa (now in Bosnia and Herzegovina), killing 23 people.

1981 
 January 14 – Ghana – An express train derails between Accra and Kumasi, killing at least 21 people and injuring about 200.
 January 19 – France – An RER A express train in Paris at Auber Station crashes killing one person and injuring 73 in a rear-end collision caused by the train driver misunderstanding a new signalling system installed only two days earlier. It is the Paris RER's first fatal accident.
 March 8 - Argentina - Brandsen rail disaster - Occurred when a passenger train collided head-on with a freight train, killing 34.
 May 14 – South Korea – An express from Pusan (now Busan) to Seoul is stopped after hitting a motorcycle on a level crossing at Taegu (now Daegu). The local train following should be stopped by signals, but proceeds and collides with the express; 54 are killed.
 June 4 – Poland – Osieck rail crash: About 3.45 p.m. there was a head-on collision between PKP class EN57 and a freight train with two heavy locomotives: 25 people were killed (mostly railroad workers who were returning home from work), 8 survived; crew of freight train, which passed signal at danger, survived too.
 June 6 – India – Bihar train derailment: Hundreds are killed (300–800) when a train falls into a river.
 June 25(?) – USSR – Near Gagra (now in Abkhazia, claimed by Georgia), an express train reportedly collides with a local, killing 70 people and injuring over 100.
 July 3 – United States – Motorman killed and 140 injured when a Manhattan bound New York City Subway train collided into the rear of a second train in a tunnel in the New Lots line of Brooklyn near Sutter Avenue station at approximately 1:50pm. Thousands of passengers had to be evacuated from the underground lines. The crash was blamed both on a Railway signal failure and the deceased Motormen who was traveling unsafely during sporadic Power outages in a dark tunnel.
 July 9 – China – 1981 Chengdu–Kunming rail crash: Passenger train No. 442 plunges into the Dadu River after the Liziyida bridge was destroyed by a mudslide 15 minutes earlier; both engines and three carriages fall into the water while a fourth overturns at the tunnel exit; 260, 275 or 360 people killed or lost (depending on source). The accident remains the deadliest in China.
 July 16 – India – Freight and passenger trains collide at Bilaspur, Chhattisgarh, killing 38 people and injuring 42.
 July 18 – India – A derailment near Dangarva (near Ahmedabad), possibly due to sabotage, kills 35 people.
 July 31 – Pakistan – The Awar Express from Karachi en route to Lahore and Peshawar, carrying many Muslim passengers because of the end of Ramadan, derails on damaged track, possibly due to sabotage, at Bahawalpur; at least 30 are killed.
 August 11 - United States - In Boston, an MBTA Train collided onto another train, 4 people were killed.
 August 31 – India – The derailment of a Madras (now Chennai) to Delhi express, near Asifabad Road station in Rebbena, kills at least 25 people and injures at least 40.
 December 11 – United Kingdom – Seer Green rail crash: Due to heavy snow, tree branches fell onto the tracks of the line from London Marylebone to High Wycombe, between Gerrards Cross and Seer Green. Trains were being warned and one driver stopped for a few minutes to clear some branches, but the Gerrards Cross signalman assumed at first that the track still showed occupied on his diagram because a branch was shorting out the track circuit.

1982
 January 13 – United States – Washington, D.C.: 1982 Washington Metro train derailment - An Orange line train derails on the Washington Metro between the Smithsonian and Federal Triangle stations. While the train was being backed, the derailed truck drives the aluminum car into a tunnel support, killing three people. By coincidence this happened less than 30 minutes after Air Florida Flight 90 crashed into the 14th Street Bridge.
 January 27 – Algeria – Bouhalouane train crash: An express train from Algiers to Oran, overloaded with 450 passengers, stalls when climbing a hill at Beni Helouane,  so another locomotive is brought in. But when the train's existing locomotive is uncoupled, braking on the passenger cars is lost and they run away, killing at least 130 people and injuring 140.
 January 27 – India – At Agra, a late-running express crashes into a goods train in fog during a power outage. Poor visibility of the oil lamps substituting for the normal signals is suspected, but the Minister of Railways blames the driver of the express. There are 63 killed and 41 injured.
 March 14 – United States – Mineola, New York: A Long Island Rail Road train hits a van at a level crossing on Herricks Road killing nine and injuring one.
 March 17 - Vietnam - Vietnam Railways passenger train 183 (also known as SE6), coming from Nha Trang, derailed while approaching a C-curve rail near Bàu Cá station, Đồng Nai province, killing over 200 passengers and crews on board. Ten of 13 carriages were thrown off the tracks. There are many theories around the cause of the accident: the investigators confirmed that the train has lost its brakes, while some people believe that the connection between the carriages were damaged. This is considered as the most tragic railway accident in the history of Vietnam Railways.
 May 28 – China – Liaoning, Xinmin: Jinzhou Railway Bureau DFH1 diesel locomotive of Shanhaiguan locomotive depot of Jinzhou Railway Branch, double locomotive double locomotive traction 193 through passenger express train from Jinan to Jiamusi, when the train drove to Xinglongdian of Shenyang-Shanhaiguan Railway, a major train overturning accident occurred, causing 2 locomotives and 7 passenger cars to derail and overturn, killing 3 people, seriously injured 20 people and slightly injured 127 people on the spot; DFH1 diesel locomotive is scrapped and broken; Four passenger cars, three big ones, two small ones, one guard car, 600 meters of damaged lines, two groups of turnouts, 666 sleepers of all kinds, three electric transfer machines and three shunting signals were scrapped, and the downgoing traffic of Shenyang-Shanhaiguan Railway was interrupted for 19 hours and 45 minutes, resulting in a direct economic loss of more than 1.71 million yuan. The direct cause of the accident was that the workers in xinglongdian road maintenance work area of Dahushan Public Works section of Jinzhou Railway Bureau violated labor discipline and operating procedures when doing the repair work of jointless track there. They set the track lifter on the inner side of the rail without authorization and withdrew from their posts. They went to the crossing guard room five meters away from the operation site to eat ice lollies. When the train 193 passed, it hit the track lifter, causing the train to derail and overturn.
 May 31 – United States – Colonial Heights, Virginia: A Seaboard Coast Line freight train of 132 cars derailed at the Swift Creek Bridge after a hard run-in of slack due to changing grades. One tank car was breached and caught fire. No train personnel were injured, but 12 firefighters and a state emergency official were injured during firefighting operations. It was determined that the train was traveling over the speed limit for a restricted classification and the engineer failed to control the slack action of the train while transiting changes in grades. Miscommunication of hazardous materials information resulted in the misdirection of emergency response efforts, causing the 13 injuries.
 July 7 – United States – Fair Lawn, New Jersey: Teenagers throw a switch and send a commuter train into a pasta factory resulting in the death of the engineer. Four youths are eventually charged with various crimes relating to the wreck.
 July 12 – Mexico – A Nogales-to-Guadalajara passenger train derails into a ravine in a remote mountainous area near Tepic; at least 52 are killed and at least 120 injured.
 August 2 – West Germany – Ostercappeln: Two drunk British Army soldiers from the Duke of Edinburgh's Royal Regiment, at Mercer Barracks, steal an armoured personnel carrier (AFV432) at the Osnabrück barracks and crash into the oncoming D 15233 after the APC has been driven on the Rollbahn railway tracks. Both engines of the train and five cars derail, the tank is completely destroyed. 23 people are injured, the two soldiers are instantly killed.
 September 12 – Switzerland – A bus carrying members of Schönaich sports association was hit by a late-running three-car regional train on a level crossing in Pfäffikon when an attendant failed to close manually operated barriers. 39 people on the bus were killed, only 2 survived.
 October 17 – Argentina – Two passenger trains collided in Quilmes, killing more than 20 and injuring 70.
 November 11 - United States - Selma, California:  A freight train derailed just south of Fresno. There were no casualties but the damage was severe; 17 train cars, all their cargo, rails, and 54 brand-new Camaros and Firebirds/Trans Ams. The cars were on the way to the dealer. Some of these cars were used as stunt cars during the production of then new television series Knight Rider.

1983
 March 22 – Bangladesh – A bridge near Ishurdi  collapses under a train, with the corresponding ends of successive spans falling. The train is dumped onto a dry section of the river bed and one car ends up almost vertical, leaning against the bridge with one end on the ground and the other in mid-air. About 60 people are killed. 
 June 10 – Egypt – One train crashes into the rear of another south of Cairo, and ends up with a baggage car standing vertically on its end that was crushed between the locomotive and the first passenger car. At least 22 people are killed in the accident and 46 injured.
 August 21 – Ireland – Cherryville Junction, County Kildare: a train, out of fuel and stopped, is hit by a second train from the rear which had passed a danger signal. 7 people are killed and 55 are injured.
 September 2 - United States - A Baltimore and Ohio Railroad train derailed near Murdock, Illinois, starting a fire. The fire heated tanks filled with liquefied petroleum gas, resulting in two large boiling liquid expanding vapor explosions.
 November 6 – China – Jiangsu, Nanjing – ND2 diesel locomotive of Shanghai Railway Bureau Nanjing Locomotive Depot pulled 155 passenger trains from Sankeshu (三棵树站) to Shanghai in the charge of Harbin Railway Bureau to run to the general departure signal at the east of Nanjing. Due to low visibility in foggy days, the driver could not see the signal, so he stopped to identify the signal. At this time, the 773 freight train ran to the fifth route signal at the downstream, and the driver did not see the signal clearly, Passing the signal blindly, when continuing to run to the route 6 signal, the crew saw the signal displaying a red light, but mistook it for the red light changed after the locomotive pressed the track circuit, so they ran through the red light and continued to run. They collided with the 155 passenger trains that had just started, causing 1 death of the freight forwarder of 773 freight trains, 1 serious injury to 1 passenger, 30 minor injuries to 30 passengers of 155 passenger trains, and 5 hours and 57 minutes of interruption of operation, The downlink main line was interrupted at 84:19.
 December 31 - Philippines - PNR 900 Class DEL 905 and 910 Collided Between Tagkawayan and Hondagua stations. Both drivers had been given line-clear certification at both stations causing them to collide.

1984 
 January 7 – Canada – Medicine Hat, Alberta: A Canadian Pacific Railway eastbound freight train derails after losing braking power and gaining excessive speed upon entry into the city's river valley, killing one crew member.
 March 5 – United States – Kittrell, North Carolina: The Amtrak Silver Star derails after overheated bearings cause an axle to break on the rear locomotive, injuring 52. Although heavy rain conditions occurred at the time of the accident, it was not considered a factor in the derailment.
 May 14 – China – Liaoning, Xinmin – Shenyang Railway Bureau DFH3 diesel locomotive in Shenyang locomotive depot pulled No.117 through passenger train express from Jining to Sankeshu (三棵树站) undertaken by Jinan Railway Bureau on Shenyang-Shanhaiguan Railway. The train was overcrowded and overloaded extremely seriously. At 12:05 noon on the same day, when the train was running to the downlink main line from Fangjia to Dahongqi, The No.7 carriage suddenly caught fire, and it soon spread to No.6 and No.8 carriages. At 12:45, the train stopped at k89+920 in the section from Fangjia railway station to Dahongqi railway station. Then the local army and civilians rushed to the fire scene to fight the fire recklessly. After nearly 50 minutes of fighting, the fire of 117 passenger trains was finally completely extinguished. This accident caused 6 passengers to be burned and 22 passengers to be burned, Carriages No.6 and No.7 were burned and scrapped, carriage No.8 was burned to a small extent, and the down main line of Shenyang-Shanhaiguan Railway was interrupted for 1 hour and 14 minutes, constituting a major passenger train fire accident. The fire was caused by Sun Wenjiang, a passenger next to seat No.83 in carriage No.7, who forgot to put out his cigarette and accidentally lit the bamboo basket containing ducklings he carried with him. In addition, many stewards of the train are usually lax in discipline and have a formalistic working attitude, Perfunctory, lack of sense of responsibility, panic in the event of an emergency, like headless flies running around, no one rushed to rescue passengers, which is in sharp contrast to the desperate fire fighting of the local army and civilians. After the court trial, train attendant Mr Bai of No. 117 passenger train was directly responsible for the fire accident and was expelled from the road, and transferred to the judicial organ for criminal responsibility. The specific criminal responsibility is unknown, Mr Shi and Mr Yu, the co conductor of the 117 passenger train, took important responsibilities and were respectively expelled from the road and kept on the road for inspection for one year. The other members of the train crew involved were respectively punished by administrative demerits and administrative warnings. The head of the Jinan Railway Bureau Jinan passenger transport depot and the Secretary of the Party committee, who were responsible for the accident, were punished by administrative demerits and administrative warnings and notified globally, Jinan Railway Bureau the director of Jinan Branch and the Secretary of the Party committee bear the leadership responsibility and order an in-depth inspection and an overall notification.
 May 29, 1984 – United States – Connellsville, Pennsylvania: The Amtrak Capitol Limited derails following a railbed washout, injuring 23. The cause was discarded tie ends from track maintenance blocking the drainage culverts. Also the railroad had no system for tracking dangerous local weather. Help was delayed because all radios on the locomotive were damaged in the crash.
Fifteen people are injured.
 July 7 – United States – Williston, Vermont: The Amtrak Montrealer derails following a railbed washout, killing five people and injuring nearly 140.
 July 14 – Yugoslavia – At Divača (now in Slovenia), a freight train violates signals and crashes at  into a stationary 14-car express en route from Belgrade (now in Serbia) to Koper (now in Slovenia) and Pula (now in Croatia) with 1,400 passengers on board. The last 3 passenger cars and 16 goods wagons are destroyed, 31 people die, the property damage is assessed at 64 million dinars (then about £340,000), and the driver is arrested.
 July 23 - United States - Head on crash between Amtrak Train 151 and Amtrak Train 168 occurs on the Hell's Gate Bridge, Queens, NY. 1 passenger was killed, 125 injured.
 July 30 – United Kingdom – Polmont rail accident, a push-pull train derails after colliding with a cow, killing 13.
 August 16 – India – Heavy rain causes a flash flood that collapses a narrow-gauge railway bridge between Charegaon and Balaghat, but the railway has not taken the usual monsoon-season precautions such as providing a watchman who would warn oncoming trains. A night train from Jabalpur to Gondia falls into the nullah and at least 112 people are killed.
 October 11 – United Kingdom – Wembley Central rail crash: A passenger train overruns a signal and collides with a freight train at Wembley Central station, London. Three people are killed. There were also 18 injured. The cause was a signal passed at danger, apparently caused by the passenger train's driver having an attack of an unusual form of amnesia. A medical board concluded that this was due to a transient disturbance of blood flow in the posterior cerebral arteries.
 October 31 – Argentina – A commuter train rams into a bus and shoves it  down the rail tracks, scattering wreckage and bodies along the way at San Justo, suburb of Buenos Aires, killing 43 people; another ten are injured.
 November 23 – India – At Byculla station in Bombay (now Mumbai), 7 cars of a packed commuter train derail; 25 people are killed and 47 injured.
 November 30 – United Kingdom – A passenger train is derailed by a broken rail at Stoulton, Worcestershire. Two people are injured.
 December 4 – United Kingdom – Eccles rail crash: An express passenger train collides with a freight train in Eccles, Greater Manchester, killing 3 people and injuring 68.
 December 11 - United Kingdom - A London Underground Train crashed into a stationary train at Kilburn Train Station, the cause of the train crash was a signal error, 1 person was killed and 16 people were injured.

1985
 January 13 – Bangladesh – When fire breaks out on the Samanta express train from Khulna to Parbatipur, passengers pull the communication cord but the driver does not stop, apparently because robbers operate in the area. The official death toll is 27, with at least 58 injured, but news reports say 150 or more are killed.
 January 13 – Ethiopia – Awash rail disaster: A derailment hurled a train into a ravine at the Ethio-Djibouti Railway, near Awash, killing at least 428 people. This accident is the worst railroad disaster in Africa.
 February 23 – India – On a train to Nagpur, the communication cord has been disconnected to prevent abuse. A fire breaks out and 34 people are killed according to the official figures, but newspapers report 60 to 100 dead.
 March 23 – Australia – Trinder Park, Queensland: Two people were killed and 31 injured when two Electric Multiple Units collided head on.
 April 16 – United States – Granby, Colorado: The Amtrak California Zephyr derailed following a landslide under the railbed, injuring 32. The landslide, caused by extraordinarily heavy snow melt, nearly dammed the adjacent Fraser River. Help was delayed because all radios on the locomotive were damaged in the crash and the site was only accessible via the rail tracks.
 June 11 – Israel – HaBonim disaster, HaBonim: 21 people killed, including 19 school children in a collision between a bus on a school field trip and a train going from Haifa to Tel Aviv near HaBonim.
 June 13 – India – 38 people are killed in a collision at Agra.
 July 4 – United States – Steamtown, U.S.A.: Roaring Brook Township, Pennsylvania. A private venture excursion train hit and killed an intoxicated woman(Diana Richter, aged 23).
July 8 – France – : A passenger train collides with a lorry on a level crossing at Saint-Pierre-du-Vauvray. Eight people are killed and 55 are injured.
 August 2 – Mozambique – RENAMO rebels in the Mozambican Civil War claim responsibility for a disaster that kills 58 people and injures 160, but the government declares it was an accident.
 August 2 – United States – Westminster, Colorado: Two Burlington Northern locomotives collided head-on, claiming the lives of 5 crew members.
 August 3 – France – The stationmaster at Assier authorizes a local autorail en route from Rodez to Brive to proceed onto a single-track section, then remembers that an express from Paris to Capdenac is expected in the other direction. With no way to notify the local, he races after it in his car, but the trains collide head-on near Flaujac; 35 people are killed and 165 injured, 29 seriously. 
When the driver gets the cab signal for the second restriction, he initially mistakes it for a remainder of the first one, and fails to slow in time. All the passenger cars derail, and a mail train going from Brive to Paris collides with the wreckage. Altogether 43 are people killed and 38 seriously injured. Following this third major crash in two months, the president of SNCF resigns.
 September 5 or 6 – Sudan – In heavy rain, a westbound night freight train with locomotives at front and rear is derailed by a washed-out embankment and plunges about  into a wadi near Sungikai, west of Er Rahad on the line from Kosti to Nyala. Coupled behind the train's first locomotive is a crew sleeping car, followed by a failed locomotive; these three vehicles drop vertically and the wooden-bodied sleeping car is crushed between the other two. One crew member is found dead in the car; another cannot be found and is presumed drowned.
 September 11 – Portugal – Alcafache train crash: The Sud Express linking Porto-Paris collides head-on with a Regional train linking Guarda-Coimbra at Alcafache (Beira Alta Line) between Nelas–Mangualde, Viseu. Portuguese officials claimed 49 killed, but Portuguese media claimed at least 150 people killed.
 September 14 – Switzerland – A Lausanne–Morges passenger train collided head-on with two electric locomotives at Denges, Morges, in an incident caused by railroad worker missing a switching point at a safety catch point, killing five people and injuring 56.
 December 22 – Italy – An electric locomotive collides with a freight train in Coronella, Ferrara, killing 10 people and injuring 11.

1986
 February 1 – South Africa – Two commuter trains collide at KwaMashu, probably due to a signal malfunction; 39 are killed and about 70 injured, some of them trapped in the wreckage for 12 hours.
 February 8 – Canada – Hinton train collision, Dalehurst, Alberta: 23 lives lost when Via Rail passenger train and CN freight train collide head-on. This resulted in the adoption of stricter crew scheduling practice and a complete rewrite of the operating rules.
 February 17 – Chile – Queronque rail accident, a Valparaíso–Santiago express train collided head-on with local train, near Limache. The official death toll was 58 people with 510 injured. The tragedy prompted the full express route's cancellation.
 March 9 – United Kingdom – A passenger train is in a head-on collision with two light engines at Chinley, Derbyshire due to a signalman's error. Lack of training and a power cut are contributory factors. One person is killed.
 March 10 – India – Over 50 people are killed in a collision in Bihar.
 May 5 – Portugal  – Póvoa de Santa Iria train collision: a collision between two trains in the Póvoa train station caused the death of 17 people and injured 83 other.
 May 15 – Bangladesh – A crowded express derails near Bheramara due to sabotage (attributed to Sarbahara Marxists), and several cars fall into water; at least 25 are killed and 45 injured.
 May 18 – United States – An excursion train pulled by Norfolk and Western 611 on Norfolk Southern Railway derailed in the Great Dismal Swamp near Suffolk, Virginia. 12 passenger cars derailed, 3 being flipped over entirely. 150 people were injured, 7 critically. Cause determined to be worn wheel flange that picked a switch. Resulted in Norfolk Southern requiring tightlock couplers on all passenger equipment and imposing a 40 mph speed restriction on all steam locomotives.
 June 15 – United Kingdom – An express passenger train is derailed at Motherwell, Lanarkshire injuring 12 due to thermal buckling of track at a junction.
 July 8 – United States – Miamisburg train derailment, a Baltimore and Ohio freight train derailed along the Great Miami River in Miamisburg, Ohio, igniting phosphorus contained in some of the tanker cars and creating a huge toxic cloud. The evacuation of approximately 30,000 people across Montgomery County, Ohio, as a result was the largest evacuation in Ohio history. 569 persons were treated for various injuries, more than $3.5 million in property damage occurred, and more than $1 billion in lawsuits resulted. The accident was the second major rail disaster in Miamisburg within an eight-year period.
 July 26 – United Kingdom – Lockington rail crash, a passenger train hit a Ford Escort van on a level crossing at Lockington, England, killing nine and injuring 59.
 September 19 – United Kingdom – Colwich rail crash, An express passenger train overruns signals at Colwich, Staffordshire and comes to halt foul of a junction. Another express passenger train is in collision with it, killing one person and injuring 75. Thirty-two people are hospitalised. 
 October 9 – United States – Twelve cars of an Amtrak passenger train derailed in rural south-central Wisconsin, killing a crewman and injuring at least 33 other people. 
 November 8 – Thailand – Bangkok: 5 people die and 7 are injured when an unmanned train runs away from the maintenance depot for 15 kilometers at a speed of 50 km/h toward Hua Lamphong station and hits the buffer stop.
 November 6 – USSR – In what is now Ukraine, trains from Kiev (now Kyiv) to Donetsk and from Krivoy Rog (now Kryvyi Rih) to Kiev collide head-on at Kirovograd (now Kropyvnytskyi) after one of the engine crew falls asleep and violates signals; 41 are killed.
 December 28 – Japan – An out-of-service train fell onto a fish processing factory, caused by strong wind at Amarube railroad bridge, Kasumi, Hyogo. One train conductor and five factory workers are killed.

1987
The force of the impact completely destroyed two head-end Amtrak locomotives, a Conrail locomotive and derailed the rest of the train, killing the Amtrak engineer, a lounge car attendant and 14 passengers. The subsequent investigation revealed that the in-cab signaling system of the Conrail lead locomotive was inoperative and that the Conrail crew had been smoking marijuana. This notorious accident, Amtrak's deadliest at the time, caused the US railroad industry to tighten up drug use detection among operational personnel and subsequently led to the federal certification of locomotive engineers.
 January 16 – Sudan – An accident at Kosti kills 21 people and injures 45.
There are 3,000 people aboard each train; 58 are killed and 140 injured. It is reported that maintenance work caused a signal failure.
 March 9 - New Brunswick, Canada - Canadian National ore train derailed. 
March 10 - United Kingdom – Before the Docklands Light Railway opened, a test train crashed through buffer stops at the original high-level Island Gardens terminus and was left hanging from the end of the elevated track. There were no injuries among the test engineers onboard.
March 24 – United Kingdom – A freight train overran a signal and was in a head-on collision with a passenger train at Frome North Junction, Somerset. Several people are seriously injured.
 July 2 – Zaire (now Democratic Republic of the Congo) – A heavy truck from Zambia crashes into the side of a train at a level crossing in Kasumbalesa, derailing two cars; 128 people are killed.
 July 8 – India – A Deccan of Hyderabad-Hazrat Nizamuddin of Delhi Dakshin Express derailed at Macherial, Andhra Pradesh, killing 53.
 August 6 – India – Some cars break off a freight train at Palamau; an express en route from Tatanagar to Amritsar crashes into them, and several cars fall into the water. About 50 people are killed, and 150 are trapped on board for up to 18 hours.
 August 7 – USSR – Kamensk-Shakhtinsky rail disaster: In what is now Russia, a freight train runs away at about  due to brake problems. Ahead of it is a passenger train from Rostov to Moscow, whose driver is ordered to stay ahead of the runaway by skipping the usual stop at Kamenskaya. He gets the order when the train has already stopped, and the conductor does not get it at all. The driver tries to start away immediately from the station, but the conductor applies the emergency brake. The trains collide, killing 106 people.
 October 19 – Indonesia – Bintaro train crash: A local train from Rangkasbitung with 600 passengers collides head-on with another local train with 300 passengers bound for Merak, at Bintaro Jaya, south of Jakarta, killing at least 156 people, injuring at least 300. Worst rail accident in Indonesia's history.
 October 19 – United Kingdom – Glanrhyd Bridge collapse: Four people died when a passenger train from Swansea to Shrewsbury fell off a bridge that had collapsed due to exceptional flood conditions of the river beneath the bridge acting on its piers.
 November 18 – United Kingdom – King's Cross fire: Grease under an escalator at King's Cross St Pancras tube station in London is ignited, apparently by a dropped match. (Smoking had only recently been prohibited in tube stations and many people would still light cigarettes on the way out.) Measures to control the fire are ineffective and a flashover kills 31 people in the station and injures 100, 19 seriously.
 November 28 – India – At Kishangarh, fire breaks out on board a train from Ajmer to Delhi; at least 22 are killed and 16 injured.
 November 29 – USSR – On the line between Tbilisi (now in Georgia) and Baku (now in Azerbaijan), freight and passenger trains collide in what is now the border area, between Gardabani and Böyük Kəsik,  after one of the drivers falls asleep. There are 30 people killed and 66 injured; two railway officials not only lose their jobs but are expelled from the Communist Party.
 December 11 – Egypt – A bus carrying local primary school children returning from the Giza Zoo was smashed by a high-speed train at an unmarked railroad level crossing at Ain Shams, on the outskirts Cairo, Egypt, killing 62 children and injuring 67.

1988
 January 7 – China – A railwayman on a train from Guangzhou to Xi'an drops a cigarette into a bucket of flammable liquid and the resulting fire kills 34 people and injures 30. He is sentenced to life in prison.
 January 14 – United States – Thompsontown, Pennsylvania: Two Conrail freight trains collide head-on after one train ignores a signal. The engineers and brakemen on both trains are killed, and damage totals $6 million. The crash is attributed to crew fatigue.
 January 15 – Canada – A CP Rail freight train slams into the rear of a switcher train on the outskirts of Regina, Saskatchewan, killing two people and derailing several cars in Canada's third train wreck in three days, railway spokesmen said.
 January 17 – China – A head-on collision in Heilongjiang province kills about 18 people and injures about 72; sabotage is suspected.
 January 19 – East Germany – Forst Zinna rail disaster: A Soviet tank in Forst Zinna gets stuck on a level crossing and gets hit by an express train. 6 people die, 33 are injured.
 January 24 – China – The derailment of a special express from Kunming to Shanghai kills at least 90 people and seriously injures 66.
 March 23 – Spain – Juneda, Catalonia. 10 children and 5 adults die when a train slams into a bus on an unbarriered level crossing.
 March 24 – China – Apparently due to signals being violated, an express from Nanjing to Hangzhou with 193 Japanese high-school students on board collides head-on with one going from Changsha to Shanghai, at Nanxiang in suburban Shanghai. One source says 12 people are killed (including two of the students) and 29 injured; another says 28 are killed, most of them students, and 1,209 injured.
 April 11 - United States - A trolley jumps the tracks at 33rd Street Station in Philadelphia, injuring 27 people.
 April 25 - Denmark - A train in Sorø is derailed, killing 8 people and injuring 72.
 May 20 – Thailand – At Takhli, a heavy truck crashes into the side of a train at a level crossing. Several cars are derailed, some of them falling into an irrigation canal; 27 people are killed and at least 22 injured.
 June 4 – USSR – Arzamas train disaster: A freight train carrying 118 tons of explosives from Dzerzhinsk to the Kazakh SSR explodes at a railway crossing near Arzamas I railway station, Nizhny Novgorod Oblast (now in Russia), damaging 151 nearby buildings and killing 91 people. The explosion leaves an 85 foot deep crater.
 June 27 – France – Gare de Lyon rail accident: The driver of a suburban train from Melun inadvertently disables most of the brakes following an earlier problem. The train runs away and hits a stationary rush-hour train in the station; 56 people are killed and over 50 injured.
 July 8 – India – Peruman railway accident: According to Press Trust of India report, a Bangalore–Trivandrum Island Express derails and plunges into Ashtamudi Lake on the outskirts of Kollam, Kerala, 107 people drowned.
 August 16 – USSR – A high-speed train traveling from Leningrad (now Saint Petersburg) to Moscow (both now in Russia) derails near Bologoye, killing 30 people and injuring about 180.
 October 9 – Yugoslavia – In what is now Serbia, the rear cars of a train from Skopje (now in North Macedonia) to Belgrade derail while passing a stationary freight train in the station at Lapovo, and smash into the freight locomotive. At least 33 are killed and 15 injured.
 December 12 – United Kingdom – Clapham Junction rail crash, London: wrong side failure from electrical short circuit caused by faulty signal maintenance, 35 people dead, more than 100 injured.

1989
 January 15 – Bangladesh – At Pubail, Gazipur District, a northbound mail train collides head-on with an express going to Chittagong because railway staff do not know how to operate the new signal system, and several cars roll off an embankment into a rice paddy. Due to the Bishwa Ijtema religious festival at Tongi, there are over 2,000 people in total on the two trains, many riding on roofs or between cars; at least 170 are killed and over 400 injured.
 February 2 – United States – 1989 Helena train wreck - A runaway train crashes into parked rail cars.
 March 2 – Ethiopia – A freight train, with many people riding on it, collides with some empty cars; 57 people are killed and 54 injured.
 March 4 – United Kingdom – Purley station rail crash, London, England: As one train crosses over from one track to another, a second train runs a red signal and collides with the first train; the accident leaves six people dead and 94 injured.
 March 6 – United Kingdom – Glasgow Bellgrove rail accident, two commuter trains crash at Bellgrove station in the East End of Glasgow. One passenger and the driver of one of the trains were killed.
 April 3 – Italy – Two cars of the train from Bari derailed and slammed against the rail at San Severo, Foggia, killing eight and injuring 20.
 April 16 – India – Karnataka express train derailed at Lalitpur, Uttar Pradesh, killing 75 people.
 May 12 – United States – San Bernardino train disaster, San Bernardino, California: A Southern Pacific Railroad freight train derails on Duffy Street after descending the very steep Cajon Pass, killing two crew members and two children, ages 7 and 9. Eleven homes were severely damaged or completely destroyed in the accident. 13 days later fuel leaking from a pipeline damaged in the recovery ignites, killing 2 people and causing further damage to homes.
 May 19 – Mozambique – A collision of two trains in Zambezia Province that kills at least 28 and injures 48 is attributed to bad maintenance.
 June 4 – USSR – Ufa train disaster: Near Asha (now in Russia), 575 people are killed and over 600 wounded when two trains pass near a leaking natural gas line which explodes.
 June 26 – China – An explosion in the toilet compartment of a train from Hangzhou to Shanghai kills 20 people and injures 11. Because explosives are not allowed on trains, passengers who work with explosives sometimes hide theirs in that area; consequently it is not known whether the blast was malicious or accidental.
 August 4 – Cuba – The head-on collision of two passenger trains at Colón kills 32 people and injures 17.
 August 10 – Mexico – San Rafael River train wreck: A train carrying 330 people goes off a bridge into the San Rafael River, killing 112.
 November 1 – India – Udyan Abha Toofan express train derailed at Sakaldiha, Bihar, killing at least 48 people.
 November 6 – United Kingdom – two diesel multiple units are involved in a head-on collision at Huddersfield, West Yorkshire. Seventeen people are taken to hospital.
 November 10 – Iraq – A derailment south of Mosul kills at least 50 people.
 November 10 – Czechoslovakia – Near Nové Kopisty, international Balt-Orient express missed red signal and crashed into passegner train that stopped in Nové Kopisty due to technical issues. 6 people died and 58 was injured
 November 16 – Italy – In Crotone, two passenger trains collided on the Crotone–Catanzaro line, killing 12 people and injuring 32.
November 20 – Australia – A Melbourne suburban Hitachi train collides into a stationary suburban Comeng train at Syndal railway station, the Comeng had been delayed due to a door fault on the train. The Hitachi train had stopped at a prior signal, but then continued onwards. The impact also results in the leading carriage of the Hitachi Train buckling and splitting into two near the front of the carriage. 75 people are injured in the accident.

See also 
 List of accidents by death toll, category "other"
 List of road accidents – includes level crossing accidents.
 List of British rail accidents
 List of Russian rail accidents
 List of rail accidents in France
 Years in rail transport

References

Sources

External links

 Railroad train wrecks 1907–2007

Rail accidents 1980-1989
20th-century railway accidents